is a Japanese football player. She plays for Tokyo Verdy Beleza in the Japanese WE League. and Japan national team.

Club career
Miyagawa was born in Kanagawa Prefecture on February 24, 1998. She was promoted to L.League club Nippon TV Beleza from youth team in 2016.

National team career
In 2014, Miyagawa was selected Japan U-17 national team for 2014 U-17 World Cup. She played in all 6 matches and scored 2 goals, and Japan won the championship.

In 2016, Miyagawa was selected Japan U-20 national team for 2016 U-20 World Cup. She played in 4 matches and Japan won the 3rd place.

In 2018, Miyagawa was selected Japan U-20 national team for 2018 U-20 World Cup second time. She played in all 6 matches and Japan won the championship.

In February 2019, Miyagawa was selected Japan national team for SheBelieves Cup. At this tournament, on March 2, she debuted as right side back against Brazil.

National team statistics

References

External links

Japan Football Association

1998 births
Living people
Toin University of Yokohama alumni
Association football people from Kanagawa Prefecture
Japanese women's footballers
Japan women's international footballers
Nadeshiko League players
Nippon TV Tokyo Verdy Beleza players
Women's association football defenders
2019 FIFA Women's World Cup players
Footballers at the 2020 Summer Olympics
Olympic footballers of Japan